Follow the Star is a 1978 Hong Kong action film directed by John Woo and starring Rowena Cortes.

Plot
Miss Chen (Rowena Cortes) is a rich pop singer, and her father (John Woo) is a former criminal. On his last job before retiring, he keeps the crew's haul all for himself, and goes into hiding. One day while getting her car repaired by mechanic Ah Sing (Roy Chiao), Miss Chen is kidnapped by her father's former partners who demand a ransom.

Cast
Rowena Cortes as Miss Chen
John Woo as Miss Chen's father
Roy Chiao as Ah Sing

References

External links
 
 
 

1987 films
1987 action films
Hong Kong action films
Films directed by John Woo
1970s Hong Kong films
1980s Hong Kong films